Bonvicini is a surname. Notable people with the name include:

Caterina Bonvicini (born 1974), Italian writer
Franco Bonvicini (1941 1995), Italian comic writer
Joan Bonvicini (born 1953), American basketball coach
Michelangelo Baracchi Bonvicini, President of Atomium - European Institute for Science
Monica Bonvicini (born 1965), Italian artist